This is a list of episodes for the series NFL Rush Zone.

Series overview

Season 1: 2010–2011: Guardians of the Core

Season 2: 2012–2013: Season of the Guardians
A second season, titled NFL Rush Zone: Season of the Guardians, was announced by Nickelodeon and the NFL on September 6, 2012. The new season ran 24 episodes, and was produced by Rollman Entertainment, Inc. In the new season, Ish is now 11 and living in Canton, Ohio, and must protect the NFL from a new enemy called "Wildcard". To stop this new enemy, Ish is given new abilities and is assisted by his old friend Ash and four other preteens. The new season began airing on Nicktoons November 30, 2012 at 9:00PM. The show resumed airing new episodes in July 2013. At that time, episodes also saw a same-week premiere on Saturday mornings on NFL Network.

Season 3: 2013–2014: Guardians Unleashed
Season 3, NFL Rush Zone: Guardians Unleashed was announced by Nickelodeon and NFL on July 11, 2013. Shortly after the last episode of Season 2 premiered, a promo was released signifying that Sudden Death would return, and that the Guardians would get new suits after the first few episodes. Another change was that this season they used CGI to animate the Rusherz instead of regular 2D animation.

References

NFL Rush Zone